Pol Espargaró Villà (born 10 June 1991) is a Spanish Grand Prix motorcycle racer who for 2023 will ride in the MotoGP class for the newly named GasGas Factory Racing team, a development of Tech3. He previously spent two years with Repsol Honda Team.

Pol is the younger brother of fellow MotoGP rider Aleix Espargaró, and is best known for winning the 2013 Moto2 World Championship. This earned him a move to Monster Yamaha Tech3 in 2014 but had 3 largely unsuccessful seasons failing to score a single podium.

He won the Suzuka 8 Hours in 2015 with Bradley Smith and Katsuyuki Nakasuga, and in 2016 with Nakasuga and Alex Lowes. He is the first rider to finish on the podium riding a KTM motorcycle in MotoGP.

Career

125cc World Championship

Youngest rider to score a championship point (2006)
Born in Granollers, Barcelona, Espargaró, arrived in the 125cc World Championship in  participating in the last six races of the year. This rider from replaced the injured Andrea Iannone at Campetella Racing and made his debut on board a Derbi at the Czech Republic Grand Prix. Two months before, Espargaró had made history as a wildcard in the Catalan Grand Prix when he finished 13th to become the youngest ever point scorer in a Grand Prix at the age of just 15 years and 8 days. He ended the season winning five consecutive races in Spanish 125cc Championship to become champion, followed by a 6th-place finish at the Valencian Grand Prix.

First podium (2007)
In 2007, Espargaró aimed to further enhance the family reputation over a full season with Campetella Racing Junior Aprilia. The season start with two good results, a seventh in Qatar and fourth at Jerez, then a couple of Top 10s until the Catalan round where he finished fifth. Espargaró's turning point came in the Czech Republic where he finished in sixth place, before a top five in San Marino. The Portuguese race was the highlight point of his short career, claiming a third-place finish from seventh on the grid. Espargaró battled for the lead with Héctor Faubel and Gábor Talmácsi, finishing just 0.2 seconds behind Faubel, who won.

Return to Derbi (2008–2010)

After running last year on board an Aprilia RS125 in Belson Campetella, he switched the Aprilia for the Derbi, in this occasion an RSA and partnered by Joan Olivé. He ended up 9th in the championship, with 3 podiums and 2 poles.

Moto2 World Championship

Pons Racing (2011–2013)

2011
In 2011 he moved to Moto2 with  the HP Tuenti Speed Up team with an FTR M211, obtaining second place in Indianapolis and third place in Malaysia and finishing the season in 13th place with 75 points.

2012
In 2012 he moved to the Pons 40 HP Tuenti team. He  Came third in Qatar. He got his first win in the Moto2 class in Spain. In Portugal he came second. He won in Great Britain, He came second in Italy and Indianapolis and third in the Czech Republic after starting on all occasions from pole position. In the San Marino Grand Prix he came second. He Won in Aragon. In Japan he came second after starting from pole position. He Got pole position in Malaysia. He Won in Australia after starting from pole position. He Got another pole position in the Valencian grand Prix. He ended the season in 2nd place with 269 points.

2013
In 2013 he remained in the same team, obtaining six wins (Qatar, Catalonia, Netherlands, San Marino, Australia and Japan), a second place in Malaysia, two third places (Germany and Aragon) and six pole positions (Qatar, Catalonia, countries Bassi, San Marino, Australia and the Valencian Community). He became the world champion with 265 points.

MotoGP World Championship

Monster Yamaha Tech3 (2014–2016)

2014

In May 2013, rumours appeared linking Espargaró with the MotoGP Tech 3 satellite Yamaha racing team, to replace British rider Cal Crutchlow. After Crutchlow signed a two-year deal with the factory Ducati team, Espargaró signed a two-year deal with Yamaha, the first year of which would be with Tech 3.
He got his first points in the premier class in the United States. His best result was a fourth place in France and he ended  the season in 6th place with 136 points, also achieving Rookie of The Year and Top Independent Rider.

2015
Espargaró remained with Tech 3 into the  season, finishing in ninth place in the final championship standings. In 2015 he also won the Suzuka 8 Hours , alternating with Bradley Smith and Katsuyuki Nakasuga driving the Yamaha YZF-R1. He thus becomes the second Spanish driver to win this race, after Carlos Checa.

2016
Espargaró again remained with Tech 3 into the  season, he finished 8th in the standings with 134 points and his best finish of 4th came at the Dutch TT. At the end of 2016 Espargaro and Yamaha split.

Red Bull KTM Factory Racing (2017–2020)

2017
Prior to the 2016 Catalan Grand Prix, it was announced that Espargaró would join the factory-supported KTM team for the  season. He partnered Bradley Smith in the team, with both riders moving across from the Tech 3 outfit.
His best result is a ninth place in the Czech Republic. He ended the season in 17th place with 55 points.

2018
In 2018 he remained in the same team, obtaining a third place in the Valencian grand Prix and ending the season in 14th place with 51 points. This season he was forced to miss the Grand Prix of the Czech Republic , Austria and Great Britain as he fractured  his left collarbone in the warm up of the Czech Republic GP and the Aragon Grand Prix for a new fracture of the same bone remedied in free practice of the GP. In the Valencian Community Grand Prix he achieved his first podium in MotoGP, a third place. He closed the season in fourteenth place in the drivers' standings

2019
Espargaró's season in 2019 did not build on the expectations created at the end of the 2018 season where he and KTM achieved their debut podium. He scored KTMs first dry front row start in Misano, and KTMs best dry result in Le Mans where he finished in 6th place, 5.9 seconds behind the race winner. Espargaró finished the 2019 season 11th in the standings with 100 points.

2020
Espargaró finished the 2020 MotoGP season 5th in the standings level on points with Andrea Dovizoso, he made history by taking KTMs first pole position at the Styrian Grand Prix, another pole at the Valencian Community motorcycle Grand Prix and a total of 5 podiums in the 2020 season. At the end of 2020 he left Redbull KTM for Repsol Honda.

Repsol Honda Team (2021–2022)

2021 

Espargaró made his Repsol Honda debut at the Qatar motorcycle Grand Prix, finishing 8th on the first of the two races and 12th on the latter. He took several points scoring finishes throughout the season, but the highlight was his 5th place finish from pole position at the 2021 British motorcycle Grand Prix. Espargaró ended the season 12th in the championship on 100 points.

2022 
Espargaró started the 2022 season with a 3rd place finish at the Qatar Grand Prix. However, from then on, due to various factors both in and out of his control, Espargaró's performances have resulted in few, and low-points scoring finishes.

Tech3 GasGas Factory Racing (from 2023)
After initial uncertainty, Espargaró announced at the Austrian Grand Prix in August that he had signed a two-year deal with Tech 3 KTM Factory Racing, to be known as GasGas Factory Racing team from the 2023 season onwards - rejoined with Tech3 for the first time since 2016. His seat at Repsol Honda was allocated to 2020 World Champion Joan Mir. The reported reason for this signing was Mir's younger age compared to that of Esparagaró.

Career statistics

Grand Prix motorcycle racing

By season

By class

Races by year
(key) (Races in bold indicate pole position, races in italics indicate fastest lap)

Suzuka 8 Hours results

References

External links

 

1991 births
Living people
Spanish motorcycle racers
Motorcycle racers from Catalonia
125cc World Championship riders
Moto2 World Championship riders
KTM Factory Racing MotoGP riders
Tech3 MotoGP riders
Sportspeople from Granollers
MotoGP World Championship riders
Repsol Honda MotoGP riders
21st-century Spanish people
Moto2 World Riders' Champions